The men's shot put at the 2010 European Athletics Championships was held at the Estadi Olímpic Lluís Companys on 30 and 31 July.

Medalists

Records

Schedule

Results

Qualification
Qualification: Qualification Performance 20.00 (Q) or at least 12 best performers advance to the final

Final

References
 Qualification Results
 Final Results
 Czech shot putter Machura gets 2-year doping ban
Full results

Shot put
Shot put at the European Athletics Championships